Kogonada (sometimes styled :: kogonada) is a South Korean-born American filmmaker. He is known for his video essays that analyze the content, form, and structure of various films and television series. The essays frequently use narration and editing as lenses, and often highlight a director's aesthetic. Kogonada—the name is a pseudonym—is a regular contributor to Sight & Sound magazine and is frequently commissioned by The Criterion Collection to create supplemental videos for its home-video releases. He has also written, directed, and edited the feature films Columbus (2017) and After Yang (2021).

Life
Kogonada immigrated from South Korea as a child, and was raised in Indiana and Chicago. As of 2022, he resides in Los Angeles with his wife and two sons.

He attends screenings of his works. He explained to Filmmaker Magazine:I like Chris Marker's idea about your work being your work. I’ve also never identified much with my American name, which always feels a little strange to see or hear ... And I'm quite fond of heteronyms.His pseudonym is taken from Kogo Noda, a frequent screenwriter of Yasujirō Ozu's films. In a 2018 interview with the Financial Times, he stated: "If I’m honest, the pseudonym was about being an Asian-American too. There is something about being an immigrant in America and having the power to name yourself."

Video essays
Kogonada made his first video essay, "Breaking Bad // POV", in January 2012. Using clips from the American television series Breaking Bad, the video displays the series' use of numerous point-of-view shots from unusual angles and objects. Kogonada was inspired to create the video essay while he watched the series, noticing a recurring visual aesthetic used throughout the series.

Kogonada's first commissioned work was for Sight & Sound magazine in February 2013, titled "The World According to Kore-eda Hirokazu", which highlights director Kore-eda's regular focus on everyday life in his films. Since then, most of his video essays are commissions for companies which include the British Film Institute (publisher of Sight & Sound), The Criterion Collection, Samsung, and the Lincoln Motor Company.

Kogonada's works are part of a growing movement of video essays as a visual form of film analysis, appreciation, and criticism on the Internet; other video essayists include Nelson Carvajal and Tony Zhou, as well as film critics Kevin B. Lee, Matt Zoller Seitz and Scout Tafoya.

Kogonada's video essay "Hands of Bresson" was chosen by filmmaker Robert Greene for Sight & Sound as one of the best documentaries of 2014, with Greene stating that works like his "make clear that the line between nonfiction film and video essay is at best blurry and the best work should simply be celebrated as cinema." In March 2016, Kogonada was part of the official jury for the 16th LPA Film Festival at the Canary Islands, Spain, where he taught a master class and had screenings for 14 of his video essays at the "Bande à part" section.

Among Kogonada's video essays on influential film directors are:

{{columns-list|
Breaking Bad: POV (2011)
Wes Anderson: From Above (2011)
Quentin Tarantino: From Below (2011)
Sounds of Aronofsky (2012)
Kubrick: One-Point Perspective (2012)
Ozu: Passageways (2012)
The World According to Koreeda Hirokazu (2013)
Malick: Fire & Water (2013)
What Is Neorealism? (2013)
Linklater: On Cinema & Time (2013)
Wes Anderson: Centered (2014)
The Fox & Mr. Anderson (2014)
Hands of Bresson (2014)
Eyes of Hitchcock (2014)
Trick or Truth (2014)
Auteur in Space (2015)
Mirrors of Bergman (2015)
Godard in Fragments (2016)Way of Ozu (2016)Once There Was Everything (2017)Nothing at Stake (2020)
}}

Technique
Kogonada's video essays typically showcase a particular theme or aesthetic regularly used by a filmmaker either throughout a filmography or within a single work. Some examples are his three video essays on the aesthetics of American director Wes Anderson, who is known for using unusually symmetrical framing in his films.

His video essays are formed through the juxtaposition of images, conveying thoughts through a particular arrangement of clips. In an interview for Nashville Scene'' in March 2015, Kogonada likened creating video essays with preparing sushi: "With sushi, every cut matters. And so do the ingredients. Those two ongoing choices are the difference. What you select, and how you cut it." In comparing written essays with visual essays, Kogonada noted how words form precise observations of ideas, while visuals could convey a particular idea without providing a definite explanation. He explained that "[i]f you want to delve deep into theory, texts are the perfect medium .... However, when I'm making visual essays, I treat words as supplementary."

Filmography

Film

Television

References

Literature

External links
 
 
 

Living people
American film directors of Korean descent
English-language film directors
Video essayists
Pseudonymous artists
Year of birth missing (living people)